Annapolis Valley First Nation is composed of two Mi'kmaq First Nation reserves located in southwestern Nova Scotia. As of 2017, the Mi'kmaq population is 119 on-Reserve, and approximately 173 off-Reserve for a total population of 292. The community has a gas bar, tobacco shop, gaming centre, health centre, and a chapel. It is the second smallest First Nation community in Nova Scotia in terms of population.

In 1984 Glooscap First Nation separated from Annapolis Valley First Nation and became its own community.

Composition
Annapolis Valley First Nation is composed of five parts as shown:

References

External links
 Annapolis Valley First Nation website(archived)
 Annapolis Valley First Nation website (current as of 2016-11-03)

See also
List of Indian Reserves in Nova Scotia
List of Indian Reserves in Canada

First Nations governments in Atlantic Canada
First Nations in Nova Scotia
Mi'kmaq governments
Communities in Kings County, Nova Scotia
Communities in Hants County, Nova Scotia